Dennis Edward Neagle Jr. (born September 13, 1968) is a former Major League Baseball pitcher who played for six teams over a 13-year career. During the 1990s, he was one of the top pitchers in baseball, but his career, and personal life, deteriorated in the early 2000s. With the New York Yankees, he won the 2000 World Series over the New York Mets.

Career

Arundel Senior High School
Neagle attended Arundel Senior High School in Gambrills, MD and played on the baseball team.

University of Minnesota
Neagle attended the University of Minnesota and played on the baseball team. In 1988, he played collegiate summer baseball in the Cape Cod Baseball League for the Yarmouth-Dennis Red Sox.

Minnesota Twins
Neagle was drafted in the 3rd round of the  amateur draft by the Minnesota Twins.

Pittsburgh Pirates
The following season, Neagle posted a 13–8 record with a 3.43 ERA and became the ace of a mediocre Pittsburgh staff. That year, Neagle represented the Pirates at the All-Star Game and led the National League in innings pitched and hits allowed (221). On August 27, 1996, he pitched eight innings giving up only two runs to the first place Atlanta Braves. The next day, the Braves traded a young Jason Schmidt to Pittsburgh for Neagle in the midst of their playoff run.

Atlanta Braves
Neagle was given the opportunity to start in Game 4 of the 1996 World Series, earning a no-decision.

Neagle made the start for the Braves in the first regular season game at Turner Field, taking place on April 4, 1997. He earned another All-Star selection and finished third in Cy Young Award voting. In Game 4 of the 1997 National League Championship Series, Neagle pitched a complete-game shutout.

Cincinnati Reds

New York Yankees
The playoff-bound New York Yankees traded prospects Drew Henson, Jackson Melián and Ed Yarnall to acquire Neagle along with outfielder Mike Frank on July 12, 2000. He only registered a 7–7 record over the rest of the season with the Yankees, and his playoff performance was shaky, but his team triumphed in the 2000 World Series and Neagle earned a World Series ring.

Colorado Rockies, Tampa Bay Devil Rays and legal troubles
In December 2000, the Colorado Rockies signed Neagle and fellow left-hander Mike Hampton to expensive contracts. He went 2–4 with a 7.90 ERA, pitching what was to be his last Major League game on July 20, 2003.

Neagle missed the  season due to ligament and elbow surgeries. Then, in late November 2004, a Lakewood, Colorado, police officer ticketed him for soliciting a woman for oral sex. Less than a week later, the Rockies canceled the final year of his lucrative contract, citing a morals clause in his contract. The incident ultimately led to the end of Neagle's marriage.

He signed with the Tampa Bay Devil Rays before the 2005 season, but did not play due to injury.

Personal life
Denny Neagle was born and raised in the Annapolis, Maryland, suburb of Gambrills to Denny Sr. and Joanne Neagle. He has two sisters, Debbie and Diana, and a brother, Doug. He graduated from Arundel High School.

On January 24, 2006, Neagle pleaded guilty in Jefferson County, Colorado, on one charge of patronizing a prostitute. Although the sentence can carry a maximum of a $500 fine and up to six months in jail, Neagle was sentenced to only 40 hours of community service.

On August 27, 2007, Neagle was arrested for and later pleaded guilty to driving under the influence.

On December 13, 2007, Neagle was mentioned in the Mitchell Report in connection with steroids.

In 2012, he sued his financial adviser, William S. Leavitt, for placing 80% of his money in “alternative investments” without his consent. These investments incurred huge losses.

Neagle married hairstylist Jennifer Gray in 1996. They have three children, Denny III ("Trey") (b. January 6, 2000), and twins Chase and Avery (b. September 17, 2004). They divorced in 2006.

See also
List of Major League Baseball annual wins leaders
List of Major League Baseball players named in the Mitchell Report

References

External links

1968 births
Living people
University of Minnesota alumni
National League All-Stars
National League wins champions
Major League Baseball pitchers
Baseball players from Maryland
Pittsburgh Pirates players
New York Yankees players
Minnesota Twins players
Cincinnati Reds players
Colorado Rockies players
Atlanta Braves players
People from Gambrills, Maryland
Minnesota Golden Gophers baseball players
Yarmouth–Dennis Red Sox players
Elizabethton Twins players
Kenosha Twins players
Visalia Oaks players
Orlando Sun Rays players
Portland Beavers players
Buffalo Bisons (minor league) players
Indianapolis Indians players
Colorado Springs Sky Sox players